Khalid Leghzal (born August 9, 1988 in Tours) is a French footballer of Algerian descent. He is currently unattached after last playing for MC Oran in the Algerian Ligue Professionnelle 1.

Club career 

Leghzal began his career in the junior ranks of local clubs FA Saint-Symphorien and AC Portugal. In 2007, he was noticed by Dijon manager Rudi Garcia who signed him to the club. In 2009, he left the club and returned to AC Portugal briefly before signing with Tours FC's reserve side. He spent just one season with the club before signing a professional contract with Algerian club AS Khroub.

References

External links 
 DZFoot Profile
 

1988 births
Living people
Algerian footballers
Algerian Ligue Professionnelle 1 players
French footballers
French sportspeople of Algerian descent
AS Khroub players
Tours FC players
Dijon FCO players
MC Oran players
Sportspeople from Tours, France
Association football midfielders
Footballers from Centre-Val de Loire